Hospitals Don't Burn Down! is a 1978 pseudo-documentary short film directed by Brian Trenchard-Smith about a fire at a hospital.

Plot
A tossed cigarette from a patient causes fire to break out after midnight in a multi-storey hospital, cutting the top floors off from escape. It spreads quickly and despite the prompt action of the fire department, lack of fire safety training results in several fatalities.

Production
The movie was widely screened around the world and won a number of prizes. Trenchard-Smith says it is one of the movies of which he is most proud:
[It] won all sorts of industrial safety awards all over the world, and was Australia's highest-selling industrial film for 25 years, used all over the world. We staged a fire, cutting a multi-story hospital in half, bursting from the laundry chute out onto one floor. And the film was designed to have a whole series of lessons to be learned in a lecture afterwards. There were alarming incidents of smoking-related fires in their hospitals. It actually became a fire-safety film worldwide. It's actually a film I’m proud to have made, and I made it for very little money, but I’m very pleased that I spent the four months that I did making that. I was told that one hospital changed their arrangements after seeing the film, and moved the non-ambulatory patients from the fourth floor to the ground floor, and several months later, the fourth floor caught fire.

References

External links

Notes for trainers using the film
 at Film Australia YouTube Channel
Hospitals Don't Burn Down at Documentary Australian Foundation
Hospitals Don't Burn Down at Oz Movies

1978 films
1978 short films
1970s short documentary films
Australian short documentary films
Films directed by Brian Trenchard-Smith
1970s English-language films
1970s Australian films